This is a list of television broadcast deals for association football leagues per country. The largest domestic TV deal is the Premier League, which has agreed a deal from 2022-2025 of an estimated £4.8bn for the three years. It is also the highest value deal per game, as leagues in Scotland and England do not show every match live and have a Saturday 3pm blackout, banning all football matches to be shown live (both domestic and abroad) between 2:45pm and 5:15pm. This is unusual as most other leagues broadcast every match live.

List of domestic broadcast deals in order of value 

The following list is of Europe's top Leagues, and a few other large leagues around the world.
updated as of December 31, 2022

List in order of value per game, per league - Top 10

References 

Domestic
Association football on television